Xylopia vielana is a tree species described by Pierre; it is included in the genus Xylopia and family Annonaceae. No subspecies are listed in the Catalogue of Life.

Distribution 
Xylopia vielana can be found in the tropical seasonal forests of Asia, at altitudes up to 700 m.  Its distribution includes Cambodia, Vietnam (where its name is giên đỏ) and south-east China (south of Guangxi); flowering is in March–June; fruiting: July–October.

Description 
Xylopia vielana is an evergreen tree up to 20 m high, with dark brown bark and tomentose branches. 
Leaves are ovate to elliptic (long: 30–70 mm, broad: 15–30 mm), more or less pubescent, obtuse to rounded base, obtuse apex with short acuminate; the 40–80 mm petiole is sometimes pubescent. 
Flowers are solitary, axillary and perfumed, with a diameter of 20 mm; sepals are oval (4 mm long), and tomentose like the petals (15 mm long), the internals being linear lanceolate (14 mm long) with pubescent carpels (4 mm long). 
Fruits are composed of oblong carpels (long: 25–35 mm, broad: 10 mm).

References 
.

vielana
Flora of Vietnam